Cole Manger (born November 11, 1982) is a former American football wide receiver in the Arena Football League who played for the Columbus Destroyers, and Grand Rapids Rampage. He played college football for the Bowling Green Falcons.

Manger was also a member of the Bowling Green Falcons basketball team.

References

1982 births
Living people
American football wide receivers
Columbus Destroyers players
Grand Rapids Rampage players
Bowling Green Falcons football players
Bowling Green Falcons men's basketball players
American men's basketball players